Type 944A is a type of very little known buoy tender built in the People’s Republic of China (PRC) for the People's Liberation Army Navy (PLAN), 
 and it received the NATO reporting name as Yanni class. There are two versions of Type 944 buoy tender: civilian version Type 944 and the military version Type 944A for the Chinese navy, and the two differ in the different types of cranes installed in the bow, and some of the portholes on the superstructure, as well as the different shapes of bulwark at the stern. Specification:
Length (m): 73.3
Beam (m): 14
Depth (m): 6.2
Draft (m): 4
Displacement (t): 2300
Speed (kt): 15

Ships

References

Auxiliary ships of the People's Liberation Army Navy
Ships of the People's Liberation Army Navy